The Northern Health and Social Care Trust is a health and social care trust in Northern Ireland, responsible for providing services at various health facilities including Antrim Area Hospital, Braid Valley Care Complex, the Causeway Hospital and Mid-Ulster Hospital.

History 
The trust was established as the Northern Health and Social Services Trust on 1 August 2006, and became operational on 1 April 2007.

Population
The area covered by Northern Health and Social Care Trust has a population of 463,297 residents according to the 2011 Northern Ireland census.

References

External links